Mugur Mateescu (born 13 June 1969) is a Romanian hurdler. He competed in the men's 400 metres hurdles at the 1996 Summer Olympics.

References

1969 births
Living people
Athletes (track and field) at the 1996 Summer Olympics
Romanian male hurdlers
Olympic athletes of Romania
Place of birth missing (living people)